Heather Anne Thomas (born September 8, 1957) is an American actress, author, and political activist, who co-starred as Jody Banks on the TV series The Fall Guy.

Early life

Thomas was born in Greenwich, Connecticut, to Gladdy Lou Ryder, a special education teacher in the Santa Monica-Malibu Unified School District. She graduated from Santa Monica High School in 1975 and went on to attend UCLA School of Theater, Film and Television, graduating in 1980. While at UCLA, she was a member of the Chi Omega sorority.

Career
Thomas started acting at age 14, when she was one of the hosts of a series on NBC called Talking with a Giant, in which she interviewed celebrities. In 1978, she began acting in small television roles; she appeared in the series Co-Ed Fever, of which she later said, "It was cancelled after the third commercial."

After Co-Ed Fever's cancellation, Thomas was chosen for the role of Jody Banks in The Fall Guy, which starred Lee Majors and was produced by Glen Larson, from its 1981 premiere to its 1986 cancellation. Thomas became addicted to cocaine during her run in the program, and entered rehabilitation for that addiction in the mid-1980s. She appeared in several movies, the first of which was Zapped! in 1982, but she gave up acting in 1998. Thomas appeared on numerous pin-up posters during the 1980s.

Following her acting career, Thomas wrote a screenplay called School Slut and sold it to Touchstone Pictures for a figure reported as "mid-six-figure." Touchstone did not make the film, however, and Thomas acquired the rights to produce it herself.

In April 2008, Thomas's first novel, Trophies, was published by William Morrow.

Personal life
Thomas married Allan Rosenthal in August 1985; Rosenthal is one of the founders of Cocaine Anonymous; they divorced in September 1986. In that same month, Thomas was struck by a car while crossing San Vicente Boulevard, and she sustained serious injuries to both of her legs. In October 1992, Thomas married entertainment attorney Harry Marcus "Skip" Brittenham. Their daughter, whom they named India Rose, was born on June 19, 2000.

Thomas left acting in part due to stalkers, as well as a desire to focus on her family and to explore writing. When asked by Reuters in 2009, "Was it really so bad in the 1980s that you had to quit?", Thomas replied, "Yes, I was getting so stalked. I had one guy climb over the fence with a knife one time. I had these two little girls and they desperately needed raising so that was that. But I think now I have gotten so old that people won’t bother me much."

Activism
Thomas and Brittenham became joint hosts of a monthly fund-raising breakfast gathering at their home in Santa Monica, California, which became known in Washington as the "L.A. Cafe". Thomas has served on the advisory boards of the Rape Foundation and Amazon Conservation Team. According to newsmeat.com, Thomas contributed over US$280,000 to political candidates since 1992, mostly to Democratic and special-interest groups, such as Sens. Barbara Boxer (D-CA), Elizabeth Warren (D-MA), and Al Franken (D-MN), with $2,400 towards supporting Republican Mary Bono.

Filmography

References

External links

Heather Thomas at Harper Collins

1957 births
Living people
Actresses from California
Actresses from Greenwich, Connecticut
American film actresses
American television actresses
People from Greater Los Angeles
UCLA Film School alumni
21st-century American women